Connecticut Yankee or A Connecticut Yankee may refer to:

 A Connecticut Yankee in King Arthur's Court, an 1889 novel by Mark Twain
 A Connecticut Yankee (musical), a Broadway musical based on the novel
 A Connecticut Yankee (film), a 1931 sound film adaptation of the novel

See also
A Connecticut Yankee in King Arthur's Court (disambiguation)
Connecticut Yankee (disambiguation)